Tiraumea River is the name of two rivers in New Zealand.

 Tiraumea River (Manawatu-Wanganui)
 Tiraumea River (Tasman)